Larry Hibbitt is a record producer from Wandsworth, London. He is guitarist/vocalist in the post-hardcore band Hundred Reasons. As a writer/producer he has worked with Nothing but Thieves, Marmozets, Sundara Karma, Saint Raymond, High Tyde, Pretty Vicious, Don Broco, Dinosaur Pile-Up, Sea Girls, Full colour, Valeras, Cortes, Geowulf, Norma Jean Martine, BLOXX and Sophie Jamieson.

Hundred Reasons 

Formed in 1999 with Colin Doran (vocals), Andy Gilmour (bass), Paul Townsend (guitar/vocals) and Andy Bews (drums), Hundred Reasons have released 5 studio albums, Ideas Above Our Station (2002), Shatterproof Is Not A Challenge (2004), Kill Your Own (2006) and Quick the Word, Sharp the Action (2007); the latter two were produced by Hibbitt, plus the latest album Glorious Sunset (2023).

After Quick the Word, Sharp the Action the band took a hiatus, returning in 2012 for a sold out UK tour and to play Banquet Records Big Day Out, Hevy and 2000Trees. Hundred Reasons are now back as a four piece as of 2022 and have recently completed recording their latest album Glorious Sunset, which was released in February 2023.

Writing and Producing 

Hibbitt has written and had cuts with Nothing But Thieves, Dinosaur Pile-Up, Saint Raymond, Cortes, Don Broco, Zibra, Geowulf and Avante Black, and his production/mixing credits include Sundara Karma, Nothing But Thieves, Marmozets, High Tyde, Sea Girls, Pretty Vicious, BLOXX, Valeras, Sophie Jamieson, Full colour and Million Dead.

References

English rock guitarists
People from Wandsworth
Living people
Year of birth missing (living people)
English songwriters
English record producers